Judas kiss may refer to:

 The Kiss of Judas, according to the Bible, the kiss with which Judas Iscariot identified and betrayed Jesus

Film, television and theatre
 Judas' Kiss (1954 film), a Spanish religious drama film
 Judas Kiss (1998 film), a 1998 American crime thriller
 Judas Kiss (2011 film), a 2011 American fiction drama film
 The Judas Kiss (play), a 1998 play by David Hare about Oscar Wilde and Lord Alfred Douglas

Books
The Judas Kiss, a 2012 novel by David Butler

Music
 "Judas Kiss" a 1988 song  by the Del-Lords from the album Based on a True Story
 Judas Kiss (album), a 2013 album by Kee Marcello
 "The Judas Kiss" (song), a 2008 song by Metallica from the album Death Magnetic
 "The Kiss of Judas", a song by Stratovarius from the album Visions
 "Judas' Kiss", a song by Petra from the album More Power to Ya